YV Rajesh or Y.V.Rajesh is a screenwriter in Malayalam cinema.
He wrote Romans and Vikadakumaran.

Filmography as writer

 2021 Erida
2018 Vikadakumaran
 2017 Georgettan's Pooram
 2016 Marubhoomiyile Aana
 2016 Shajahanum Pareekuttiyum
 2013 Romans
 2011 Three Kings
 2011 Note Out
 2009 Gulumal

References

External links

Living people
Malayalam screenwriters
Film directors from Kerala
21st-century Indian male actors
21st-century Indian dramatists and playwrights
Screenwriters from Kerala
1974 births
21st-century Indian screenwriters